The 39th Cannes Film Festival was held from 8 to 19 May 1986. The Palme d'Or went to The Mission by Roland Joffé.

The festival opened with Pirates, directed by Roman Polanski and closed with El Amor brujo, directed by Carlos Saura.

Juries

Main competition
The following people were appointed as the Jury of the 1986 feature film competition:
Sydney Pollack, American director, producer, and actor (Jury President)
Alexandre Mnouchkine, French producer
Alexandre Trauner, Hungarian-French production designer
Charles Aznavour, French-Armenian singer-songwriter
Danièle Thompson, French director and screenwriter
István Szabó, Hungarian director and screenwriter
Lino Brocka, Filipino director and screenwriter
Philip French, English film critic and producer
Sônia Braga, Brazilian actress
Tonino Delli Colli, Italian cinematographer

Camera d'Or
The following people were appointed as the Jury of the 1986 Camera d'Or:
 Anne Fichelle
 Christophe Ghristi (cinephile)
 Eva Zaoralova (journalist)
 Ivan Starcevic (journalist)
 Lawrence Kardish (cinephile)
 Pierre Murat (critic)
Serge Leroy (director)

Official selection

In competition - Feature film
The following feature films competed for the Palme d'Or:

 After Hours by Martin Scorsese
 Boris Godunov by Sergei Bondarchuk
 Down by Law by Jim Jarmusch
 The Fringe Dwellers by Bruce Beresford
 Fool for Love by Robert Altman
 Genesis by Mrinal Sen
 I Love You by Marco Ferreri
 The Last Image (La dernière image) by Mohammed Lakhdar-Hamina
 Love Me Forever or Never (Eu Sei Que Vou Te Amar) by Arnaldo Jabor
 Max, Mon Amour by Nagisa Oshima
 Ménage (Tenue de soirée) by Bertrand Blier
 The Mission by Roland Joffé
 Mona Lisa by Neil Jordan
 Otello by Franco Zeffirelli
 Poor Butterfly (Pobre mariposa) by Raúl de la Torre
 Rosa Luxemburg by Margarethe von Trotta
 Runaway Train by Andrei Konchalovsky
 The Sacrifice (Offret) by Andrei Tarkovsky
 Scene of the Crime (Le lieu du crime) by André Téchiné
 Thérèse by Alain Cavalier

Un Certain Regard
The following films were selected for the competition of Un Certain Regard:

 A Girl's Own Story by Jane Campion
 Backlash by Bill Bennett
 Belizaire the Cajun by Glen Pitre
 Burke & Wills by Graeme Clifford
 Coming Up Roses by Stephen Bayly
 Das zweite Schraube-Fragment by Walter Andreas Christen
 Desert Bloom by Eugene Corr
 Laputa by Helma Sanders-Brahms
 Man of Ashes (Rih essed) by Nouri Bouzid
 Passionless Moments by Jane Campion, Gerard Lee
 A Promise (Ningen no yakusoku) by Yoshishige Yoshida
 The Pied Piper (Krysař) by Jiří Barta
 Salomè by Claude d'Anna
 Shtei Etzbaot Mi'Tzidon by Eli Cohen
 Tai Yang by Benzheng Yu
 Two Friends by Jane Campion
 The Unknown Soldier (Tuntematon sotilas) by Rauni Mollberg
 Welcome in Vienna by Axel Corti
 Where Are You Going? (Za kude putuvate) by Rangel Vulchanov

Films out of competition
The following films were selected to be screened out of competition:

 A Matter of Life and Death by Michael Powell and Emeric Pressburger
 Absolute Beginners by Julien Temple
 El Amor brujo by Carlos Saura
 The Chipmunk Adventure by Janice Karman
 The Color Purple by Steven Spielberg
 Don Quixote by Orson Welles
 Hannah and Her Sisters by Woody Allen
 A Man and a Woman: 20 Years Later (Un homme et une femme, 20 ans déjà) by Claude Lelouch
 Pirates by Roman Polanski
 Precious Images by Chuck Workman
 T'as de beaux escaliers tu sais by Agnès Varda

Short film competition
The following short films competed for the Short Film Palme d'Or:

 15-Août by Nicole Garcia (France)
 Heiduque by Y. Katsap, L. Gorokhov (Russia)
 A Gentle Spirit (Lagodna) by Piotr Dumala
 Le Vent by Csaba Varga
 Les Petites Magiciennes by Vincent Mercier, Yves Robert (France)
 Les Petits Coins by Pascal Aubier
 Miroir d'ailleurs by Willy Kempeneers
 Nouilles Sèches (Dry Noodles) by Dan Collins
 Peel by Jane Campion (Australia)
 Question d'optiques by Claude Luyet
 Quinoscopio by Juan Padron
 Street of Crocodiles by Brothers Quay
 Turbo Concerto by Martin Barry

Parallel sections

International Critics' Week
The following feature films were screened for the 25th International Critics' Week (25e Semaine de la Critique):

 40 Square Meters of Germany (40 Quadratmeter Deutschland) by Tevfik Baser (West Germany)
 Devil in the Flesh by Scott Murray (Australia)
 La Dona del traghetto by Amedeo Fago (Italy)
 Esther by Amos Gitaï (Israel)
 Faubourg Saint-Martin by Jean-Claude Guiguet (France)
 San Antoñito by Pepe Sanchez (Colombia)
 Sleepwalk by Sara Driver (United States)

Directors' Fortnight
The following films were screened for the 1986 Directors' Fortnight (Quinzaine des Réalizateurs):

 Cactus by Paul Cox
 Comic Magazine (Komikku Zasshi Nanka Iranai) by Yōjirō Takita
 Dancing in the Dark by Leon Marr
 The Decline of the American Empire (Le Déclin de l'empire américain) by Denys Arcand
 Defence of the Realm by David Drury
 Devil in the Flesh (Diavolo in corpo) by Marco Bellocchio
 Giovanni Senzapensieri by Marco Colli
 Golden Eighties by Chantal Akerman
 Malandro (Ópera do Malandro) by Ruy Guerra
 Memoirs of a Sinner by Wojciech Has
 Qing Chun Jin by Nuanxin Zhang
 Schmutz by Paulus Manker
 She's Gotta Have It by Spike Lee
 Sid and Nancy by Alex Cox
 Sorekara by Yoshimitsu Morita
 Tarot by Rudolf Thome
 Visszaszamlalas by Pal Erdoss
 Working Girls by Lizzie Borden

Awards

Official awards
The following films and people received the 1986 awards:
Palme d'Or: The Mission by Roland Joffé
Grand Prix: Offret by Andrei Tarkovsky
Best Director: Martin Scorsese for After Hours
Best Actress: 
Barbara Sukowa for Rosa Luxemburg
Fernanda Torres  for Love Me Forever or Never (Eu Sei Que Vou Te Amar) 
Best Actor: 
Michel Blanc for Ménage (Tenue de soirée)
Bob Hoskins for Mona Lisa 
Best Artistic Contribution: Sven Nykvist (for the cinematography) for The Sacrifice (Offret)
Jury Prize: Thérèse by Alain Cavalier
Golden Camera
Caméra d'Or: Noir et Blanc by Claire Devers
Un Certain Regard
Prix Un Certain Regard: Man of Ashes (Rih essed) by Nouri Bouzid
Short films
Short Film Palme d'Or: Peel by Jane Campion
 Jury Prize for Fiction: Les Petites Magiciennes by Vincent Mercier, Yves Robert
 Jury Prize for Animation: Heiduque by Y. Katsap, L. Gorokhov

Independent awards
FIPRESCI Prizes
The Decline of the American Empire (Le déclin de l'empire américain) by Denys Arcand (Directors' Fortnight)
The Sacrifice (Offret) by Andrei Tarkovsky (In competition)
Commission Supérieure Technique
 Technical Grand Prize: The Mission by Roland Joffé
Ecumenical Jury
 Prize of the Ecumenical Jury: Offret by Andrei Tarkovsky
 Ecumenical Jury - Special Mention: Thérèse by Alain Cavalier
Award of the Youth
Foreign Film: She's Gotta Have It by Spike Lee
French Film: High Speed by Monique Dartonne and Michel Kaptur

References

Media
INA: Roman Polanski presents Pirates at the opening of the 1986 Festival (interview in French)
INA: List of winners of the 1986 festival (commentary in French)

External links
1986 Cannes Film Festival (web.archive)
Official website Retrospective 1986
Cannes Film Festival Awards for 1986 at Internet Movie Database

Cannes Film Festival
Cannes Film Festival
Cannes Film Festival
Cannes